FRTA is an acronym which may refer to:
Federal Reserve Transparency Act
Franklin Regional Transit Authority
Free Radical Theory of Aging